Green Car may refer to:

Green vehicle, a motor vehicle more environmentally friendly than the norm
First class travel, accommodations on many Japanese train lines
"The Green Car", an episode of Infinity Train

See also
Car colour popularity